Wheel on the Chimney is a 1954 children's picture book written by Margaret Wise Brown and illustrated by Tibor Gergely. The book tells the story of a pair of migrating storks building a new nest. The book was a recipient of a 1955 Caldecott Honor for its illustrations.

References

1954 children's books
American picture books
Caldecott Honor-winning works